Seok Dong-woo (born 27 May 1990) is a South Korean footballer who plays as defender for Bucheon FC 1995 in K League Challenge.

Career
Park was selected by Bucheon FC in the 2014 K League draft.

References

External links 

1990 births
Living people
Association football defenders
South Korean footballers
Bucheon FC 1995 players
K League 2 players